Movin' Along is an album by American jazz guitarist Wes Montgomery, released in 1960. It was reissued in the Original Jazz Classics series with two alternate takes. All the tracks are available in the Wes Montgomery compilation CD-set The Complete Riverside Recordings.

Reception

In his AllMusic review, Scott Yanow stated: "Wes Montgomery made many of his finest jazz recordings originally for Riverside, and this is an often overlooked gem."

Track listing 
 "Movin' Along" (Wes Montgomery) – 5:40
 "Tune-Up" (Miles Davis) – 4:27
 "Tune-Up [Alternate take]" (Davis) – 4:39
 "I Don't Stand a Ghost of a Chance with You" (Victor Young, Ned Washington, Bing Crosby) – 5:02
 "Sandu" (Clifford Brown) – 3:23
 "Body and Soul" (Edward Heyman, Robert Sour, Frank Eyton, Johnny Green) – 7:19
 "Body and Soul [Alternate take]" (Heyman, Sour, Eyton, Green) – 11:17
 "So Do It!" (Montgomery) – 6:05
 "Says You" (Sam Jones) – 4:59

Personnel 
 Wes Montgomery – guitar, bass guitar (on side 1, tracks 2 & 4; side 2, track 1)
 James Clay – flute, tenor sax
 Victor Feldman – piano
 Sam Jones – bass
 Louis Hayes – drums

Production
 Orrin Keepnews – producer

References

External links 
 Jazz Discography

1960 albums
Wes Montgomery albums
Albums produced by Orrin Keepnews
Riverside Records albums